Savanté Stringfellow (born November 6, 1978, in Jackson, Mississippi) is a U.S. born long jumper. A student at the University of Mississippi, he was selected for the United States 2000 Olympic Team.

References

blogspot

Living people
1978 births
Sportspeople from Jackson, Mississippi
American male long jumpers
African-American male track and field athletes
Olympic track and field athletes of the United States
Athletes (track and field) at the 2000 Summer Olympics
World Athletics Championships athletes for the United States
World Athletics Championships medalists
Ole Miss Rebels men's track and field athletes
World Athletics Indoor Championships winners
21st-century African-American sportspeople
20th-century African-American sportspeople